NGC 1268 is a spiral galaxy located about 140 million light-years away in the constellation Perseus. It was discovered by astronomer Heinrich d'Arrest on February 14, 1863. NGC 1268 is a member of the Perseus Cluster and appears to show signs of distortion in the form of bridges. These features may be the result of a strong interaction with NGC 1267.

On August 30, 2008 a type Ia supernova designated as SN 2008fg was discovered in NGC 1268.

See also
 List of NGC objects (1001–2000)
 Eyes Galaxies
 Mice Galaxies

References

External links
 

Perseus Cluster
Perseus (constellation)
Intermediate spiral galaxies
Interacting galaxies
1268
12332 
2658
Astronomical objects discovered in 1863
Discoveries by Heinrich Louis d'Arrest